David Owen Norris,  (born 1953) is a British pianist, composer, academic, and broadcaster.

Early life
Norris was born in 1953 in Long Buckby in Northamptonshire, England, later attending Daventry Grammar School.  He took lessons locally from composer Trevor Hold 
before going on to study music at Keble College, Oxford where he was organ scholar; he is now an Honorary Fellow of the college.

Career
After leaving Oxford, he studied composition and worked at the Royal Opera House as a repetiteur. As a pianist, he has accompanied soloists such as Dame Janet Baker, Larry Adler and John Tomlinson, and his solo career has included appearances at the Proms and performances with the Chicago Symphony Orchestra and Detroit Symphony Orchestra.  He has also presented several radio series – his Playlist Series for BBC Radio 4 has recently finished its second series – presented for television, and appeared in a number of television documentaries.  He is a professor at the Royal College of Music, the University of Southampton where he is head of keyboard, and a visiting tutor at the Royal Northern College of Music. He has also been Gresham Professor of Music and a professor at the Royal Academy of Music (having earlier been a student there).

Composition
Norris has enjoyed success as a composer in a wide range of musical styles. His Piano Concerto and Symphony were first performed at Dorchester Abbey by the English Music Festival, as was his oratorio Prayerbook, which has been frequently performed and studied subsequent to its premiere. His song cycles Think Only This (settings of war poetry) and Tomorrow Nor Yesterday (settings of the poetry of John Donne) have been released on a disc entitled Fame's Great Trumpet. His operas and operettas, including Die! Sober Flirter and The Jolly Roger, have been performed on BBC Radio and around the UK and Europe, as have several pastiches of Mozart.

Honours
In 1991, Norris received the prestigious Gilmore Artist Award.
On 12 November 2015, Norris was elected a Fellow of the Society of Antiquaries of London (FSA).

Recordings
(* = Premiere recordings)

Piano concertos

 Constant Lambert, Rio Grande (Gilmore Festival Records) Yoshimi Takeda KSO 1996
 Constant Lambert, Piano Concerto (ASV CD WHL 2122) Barry Wordsworth BBCCO* 1999
 The World's First Piano Concertos [on Square Piano] (Avie AV0014) Sonnerie 2003
 Edward Elgar, Piano Concerto realised Walker (Dutton CDLX 7148) David Lloyd-Jones BBCCO* 2005
 Joseph Horovitz, Jazz Concerto (Dutton CDLX 7188) Horovitz Royal Ballet Sinfonia 2007
 Richard Arnell, Piano Concerto (Dutton CDLX 7184) Martin Yates RSNO* 2007
 Montague Phillips, Piano Concertos in F# minor and in E (Dutton CDLX 7206)*Gavin Sutherland BBCCO 2008
 Victor Hely-Hutchinson, Jazz Concerto 'The Young Idea: cum grano salis’ (Dutton CDLX 7206)* 2008

Solo piano
 Edward Elgar/Sigfrid Karg-Elert, First Symphony (AVM AVZ-3024)* 1990
 Elgar, Sketches for Third Symphony (NMC D052)* 1998
 Peter Maxwell Davies, Farewell to Stromness (MPR 203) 1998
 Elgar, Complete Piano Music (Elgar Editions EE 002)* 2003
 George Dyson, Complete Piano Music (Dutton CDLX 7137)* 2004
 Elgar, Songs & Piano Music played on Elgar's 1844 Broadwood (Avie AV2129) Amanda Pitt, Mark Wilde, Peter Savidge (Two world premieres*) 2007
 Audio-guide to the Cobbe Collection of Composer-related instruments at Hatchlands, playing pianos formerly belonging to J. C. Bach, Charles Dibdin, Johann Baptist Cramer, Frédéric Chopin, Sigismond Thalberg, Franz Liszt, Georges Bizet, Edward Elgar etc. 2008
 Elgar/Karg-Elert/Norris, Symphonic Study Falstaff, Pomp & Circumstance (Elgar Editions EECD009)* 2009
 Giles Easterbrook, The Moon Underwater: Chamber music and piano solo (Prima Facie PFCD002)* 2010
 Roger Quilter, Complete Piano Music (EMR CD02)* 2011
 Felix Mendelssohn, Complete Songs Without Words (not yet released)

Vocal
 Roger Quilter, Songs (Hyperion A 66208) David Wilson-Johnson, baryton
 Percy Grainger, Songs (Pearl SHE 572) David Wilson-Johnson, baryton
 Franz Schubert, Winterreise (Hyperion A66111) David Wilson-Johnson 1984
 Arthur Somervell, Songs (Hyperion CDA 66187) David Wilson-Johnson 1986
 Benjamin Britten, The Turn of the Screw (Collins 70302) Bedford, Lott, Langridge 1993
 Gerald Finzi, Songs (GMN CO116) David Wilson-Johnson]] 1996
 Britten, Saint Nicolas, Steuart Bedford, Philip Langridge Naxos 8.557203 1996
 Schubert, Songs by Ludwig Gotthard Kosegarten and Johann Wolfgang von Goethe [including the only recording of Schubert's first song-cycle] (Dogstar DS001) Ian Partridge, Jennifer Bates, Ruth Peel* 2000
 Granville Bantock, Songs (Dutton CDLX 7121) Jean Rigby, Peter Savidge 2002
 London Pride (Song Recital), Catherine Bott (Hyperion CDA67457)* 2004
 Quilter, Complete Duets and Traditional Song Arrangements (Naxos 8.557495) Amanda Pitt, Joanne Thomas, Philip Langridge, David Wilson-Johnson, baryton* 2005
 Edward Elgar, Songs & Piano Music played on Elgar's 1844 Broadwood (Avie AV2129) Amanda Pitt, Mark Wilde, Peter Savidge (Two world premieres*) 2007
 Music of the Pleasure Gardens (Signum Classics SIGCD101) Philip Langridge 2007
 Trevor Hold, Song Cycles (Dutton CDLX 7213) Amanda Pitt, David Wilson-Johnson* 2008
 Victor Herbert, Songs (Linn CKD335) James Gilchrist* 2009
 Priez pour paix War-Songs (Prelude CDPR2550)* Philip Langridge, Jennifer Langridge 2010
 Entertaining Miss Austen (Dutton Epoch CDLX 7271) Amanda Pitt, John Lofthouse * 2011
 Britten in Scotland (Naxos 8.572706) Mark Wilde 2011
 Mr. Hook's Original Christmas Box (Dogstar DS010) Highcliffe Junior Choir* 2011

Chamber music
 Arnold Bax, Piano Quintet (Chandos CHAN 8795) Mistry Quartet 1990
 Edward Elgar, Piano Quintet (Argo 433 312–2) Mistry Quartet 1991
 Camille Saint-Saëns, The Carnival of the Animals (Chandos 9244) I Musici di Montreal
 Norris, All Together Now (Gilmore Festival Records)* 1996
 Frank Bridge, Viola Music (ASV CD DCA 1064) Louise Williams 1999
 George Dyson, Complete Chamber Music (Dutton CDLX 7137)* 2004
 Ludwig van Beethoven, Viola Arrangements (Toccata TOCC 0108)* Paul Silverthorne 2010
 Francis Poulenc, Babar the Little Elephant; Saint-Saëns, The Carnival of the Animals (the latter with David Coram at the Organ of Romsey Abbey, and both with narration by Richard Briers) Cathedral Classics CCCD101 2011
 Percy Sherwood, Music for cello & piano (Toccata) Joseph Spooner *Feb 2012
 John Blackwood McEwen & Arnold Bax, Viola Sonatas (EM Records) Louise Williams* Feb 2012
 Alan Rawsthorne, Kenneth Leighton, Elizabeth Maconchy, Gordon Jacob, Viola Music (EM Records) Louise Williams* Summer 2012

Radio programmes
 A History of Private Life (BBC Audio 2010 . – 6 CDs)

References

External links
Official website
Interview with David Owen Norris, August 10, 1992

Living people
1953 births
Alumni of Keble College, Oxford
Alumni of the Royal Academy of Music
Academics of the Royal Academy of Music
Academics of the Royal College of Music
Academics of the University of Southampton
British classical pianists
Male classical pianists
British classical composers
British male classical composers
British male pianists
Fellows of the Society of Antiquaries of London
20th-century classical composers
21st-century classical composers
People from Long Buckby
Piano pedagogues
Professors of Gresham College
20th-century British composers
Sydney International Piano Competition prize-winners
21st-century classical pianists
20th-century British male musicians
21st-century British male musicians